WJOB-FM (93.3 FM) is a non-commercial radio station broadcasting an Urban contemporary format. Licensed in Susquehanna, Pennsylvania, the station serves the Binghamton, New York area.  The station is owned by The Broome County Urban League. 93.3 WJOB plays a mix of the most popular rhythm and blues, hip hop, rap and dance music. On Sunday mornings the station broadcasts gospel music

References

External links

JOB-FM
Radio stations established in 2012